Józef Zabiełło h. Topór (c. 1750 – 9 May 1794 in Warsaw, Poland) of was a nobleman (szlachcic) in the Polish–Lithuanian Commonwealth. Great Łowczy of Lithuanian from 1775, konsyliarz of Permanent Council from 1782, deputy of Samogitia to the Great Sejm and Field Hetman of Lithuania from 1793, he was infamous for his support of the Russian Empire in the last years of the Commonwealth.

Early life 
Son of Antoni Zabiełło and Zofia Niemirowicz-Szczytt h. Jastrzębiec.

Polish–Lithuanian Commonwealth

Four-Year Sejm 
Opponent of the Constitution of May 3 and deputy marshal of the Targowica Confederation. After the Polish–Russian War of 1792, because of his support for the Russian, he was selected by them to be a Field Hetman of Lithuania and deputy to the Grodno Sejm, the last Sejm of the Commonwealth, infamous for being forced by Russians to sign the act of the second partition. During the Kościuszko Uprising he was apprehended by the revolutionaries in the aftermath of the Warsaw Uprising. After it was revealed that he had been receiving a steady pension from the Russian embassy for several years, he was sentenced to hanging as a traitor and executed on 9 May 1794.

References 

Year of birth unknown
1794 deaths
Clan of Topór
Targowica confederates
Members of the Great Sejm
Signers of the Polish Constitution of May 3, 1791
Field Hetmans of the Grand Duchy of Lithuania
People executed for treason against Poland
People executed by the Polish–Lithuanian Commonwealth
Executed Polish people
People executed by Poland by hanging